Randall Azofeifa Corrales (born 30 December 1984) is a Costa Rican football midfielder who currently plays for Sporting San José.

Club career
Azofeifa won two national championship, the UNCAF Nations Cup title and a CONCACAF Champions Cup title with Deportivo Saprissa. He participated in the 2005 FIFA Club World Championship Toyota Cup with his team, where he played a key role in helping them to finish in third place, behind São Paulo and Liverpool. Azofeifa joined Belgian Jupiler League club Gent in 2006.

Turkey
In January 2011 he was transferred to the Turkish team Gençlerbirliği at a transfer price of 1.6 million Euros and in May 2013 he moved on to Kayseri Erciyesspor.

In September 2014, Azofeifa returned to Costa Rica to play for Uruguay Coronado
and in January 2015 he joined Herediano.

International career
Azofeifa played at the 2001 FIFA U-17 World Championship held in Trinidad and Tobago. As of January 2014, Azofeifa has made 35 appearances for the senior Costa Rica national football team, including qualifying matches for the 2006 FIFA World Cup and 2010 FIFA World Cup. He made one appearance for Costa Rica at the 2006 World Cup. Azofeifa appeared in four matches at the 2007 CONCACAF Gold Cup.

In May 2018 he was named in Costa Rica's 23 man squad for the 2018 FIFA World Cup in Russia.

Honours
 K.A.A. Gent
 Belgian Cup: 2009–10

Career statistics

International

International goals
Scores and results list. Costa Rica's goal tally first.

References

External links

1984 births
Living people
Footballers from San José, Costa Rica
Association football midfielders
Costa Rican footballers
Costa Rica international footballers
2006 FIFA World Cup players
2007 CONCACAF Gold Cup players
Copa América Centenario players
2017 Copa Centroamericana players
2017 CONCACAF Gold Cup players
2018 FIFA World Cup players
Deportivo Saprissa players
K.A.A. Gent players
Gençlerbirliği S.K. footballers
Kayseri Erciyesspor footballers
C.S. Herediano footballers
Liga FPD players
Belgian Pro League players
Süper Lig players
Costa Rican expatriate footballers
Expatriate footballers in Belgium
Expatriate footballers in Turkey
Costa Rican expatriate sportspeople in Belgium
Costa Rican expatriate sportspeople in Turkey